Ger Farragher (born 10 June 1983) is an Irish sportsman. He played in the forward line on the Galway senior hurling team. He plays his club hurling with Castlegar.

Farragher was born in Galway in 1983 and has had much success in the game of hurling. At inter-county level he has won 2 back-to-back minor All-Ireland medals in 1999 and 2000. In 2002 he made his senior championship debut and has gone on to be one of the game's most prolific scorers. Farragher also has an All-Ireland senior hurling runners-up medal from 2005 when he was the top-scorer in the championship. He has also played on Institute of Technology, Sligo's Ryan Cup team. In 2005 Farragher claimed his first All-Star Award.

In 2010, Farragher was named Opel GPA player of the League for his performance in the National Hurling League that year.

Career statistics

References

Ger Farragher Club page 

1983 births
Living people
Castlegar hurlers
Galway inter-county hurlers
Alumni of the Institute of Technology, Sligo